Nowhere to Run is a 1993 American action drama film directed by Robert Harmon. The film stars Jean-Claude Van Damme, Rosanna Arquette, Kieran Culkin, Ted Levine, and Joss Ackland. 

Nowhere to Run was released in the United States on January 15, 1993, by Columbia Pictures. The film was the second collaboration between Van Damme and producer Craig Baumgarten, after Universal Soldier (1992).

Plot
A prison bus flips on the road when it's cut off by a car driven by Billy, who frees prisoner and partner-in-crime Sam Gillen. They escape in the car but Billy is fatally shot by a guard.

Sam buys some food from a roadside store and camps near a pond. He finds the money from their latest heist in the car trunk and listens to a tape recording left by Billy before pushing the car into the pond. That night, Sam sneaks up to a nearby house and sees a woman and her two children inside. He breaks in but is nearly discovered by one of the kids; he takes a salt shaker and leaves. The next night he breaks in again to return it; the boy (named Mike or Mookie) finds Sam's campsite.

Nearby demolition from real estate development disturbs Clydie Anderson, the owner of the home. Corrupt developer Franklin Hale seeks to drive her off the land with the help of his lackey, Mr. Dunston, and the local sheriff, Lonnie Poole, who is dating her.  

One night, goons attack Clydie and her children, but Sam arrives and fights them off.  He claims he is camping and hunting on her land, and Clydie insinuates that he is not welcome, but later offers him shelter in her barn out of gratitude. 

Sam also purchases her dead husband's old Triumph Bonneville motorcycle and repairs it with Mookie's help. Later Sam thwarts an attempt by Hale to ruin Clydie's farmland by coating it with oil.

A town council meeting gets heated when another resident, Tom, refuses to sell his land to Hale. That night, his goons burn down Tom's barn. Mookie (who discovers the fire) awakens Sam; Sam saves Tom and puts out the fire with their water tower before their fuel tanks can ignite, further angering Hale. 

Noticing that Clydie is taking a liking to Sam, Lonnie beats him and demands he leave. While tending his wounds, Clydie and Sam have sex. Lonnie continues to grow suspicious of Sam and Clydie's relationship; he finds out Sam is a fugitive and informs Clydie. Sam tells her that he and Billy robbed a bank, but Billy killed a guard defending him. He got caught, while his friend escaped.

Clydie tells him to leave, so Sam returns to his campsite. Hale enlists the sheriff's department to hunt him down, so he leads them on a motorcycle chase and ultimately escapes, but returns to Clydie.  

Running out of time and growing desperate, Hale and Dunston go to Clydie's house with guns and force her to sign over the land. Sam arrives just in time to stop them from burning down the house and kills Dunston. The police arrive and arrest Hale (who is holding Clydie at gunpoint). 

Sam allows Lonnie to arrest him, having decided to stop running but promises to return to Clydie and the kids, whom he loves.

Cast

 Jean-Claude Van Damme as Sam Gillen
 Rosanna Arquette as Clydie Anderson
 Kieran Culkin as Mike 'Mookie' Anderson
 Tiffany Taubman as Bree Anderson
 Joss Ackland as Franklin Hale
 Ted Levine as Mr. Dunston
 Edward Blatchford as Sheriff Lonnie Poole
 Anthony Starke as Billy
 James Greene as Country Store Clerk
 John Finn as Cop in chase

Production

Development and writing
Joe Eszterhas wrote the original script with director Richard Marquand, with whom he had made two films.  He had originally written the script as more of a serious drama film with action elements however according to Eszterhas "The script was taken and destroyed many years later by Jean-Claude Van Damme as Nowhere to Run," said Eszterhas. "It lost its sensitivity, it lost everything. I don't like to remember that movie."

The film was the first in a three picture deal between Van Damme and Columbia Pictures. His fee was $3.5 million. Columbia said the film is ”true to his audience and goes beyond his audience."

Van Damme later said, "the script was... not that good. The writer told me he was going to fix everything. I was in his house, he shook my hand, he promised me, but he didn't fix it."

Reception

Box office
Nowhere to Run opened January 15, 1993, in 1,745 theaters. In its opening weekend, the film made $8,203,255, at #4 behind Aladdin's tenth weekend, A Few Good Men's sixth, and Alive's first weekend.

The film finally grossed $22,189,039 in the United States and Canada. The film performed better internationally, grossing $41.9 million in other territories for a worldwide gross of $64 million.

Critical response
The film received mostly mixed reviews from critics. Rotten Tomatoes reports that 36% of 25 surveyed critics gave the film a positive review; the average rating is 4.2/10. Audiences polled by CinemaScore gave the film an average grade of "B+" on an A+ to F scale. Despite that, the film has a cult following with most fans declaring it as "one of Van Damme's better films".

References

External links
 
 
 

1993 films
1993 action films
1993 action thriller films
1993 crime films
1993 crime drama films
1993 crime thriller films
1993 drama films
1993 action drama films
1990s American films
1990s English-language films
American action films
American action drama films
American action thriller films
American crime drama films
American crime thriller films
Films set in Los Angeles
Columbia Pictures films
Films directed by Robert Harmon
Films scored by Mark Isham
Films with screenplays by Joe Eszterhas